Roberto Leonard Mălăele (born 23 March 2009) is a Romanian professional footballer who plays as a central midfielder for Liga I side Farul Constanța.

Club career

Viitorul Constanta
He made his debut on 25 October 2017 in Cupa Romaniei match against CSM Reșița, being, at 14 years, 6 month and 26 days, the youngest player who made his debut for Viitorul.
He made his Liga I debut for Viitorul Constanța against UTA Arad on 18 July 2021.

Personal life
He is the grandnephew of Romanian theater and film actor Horațiu Mălăele.

Career statistics

Club

References

External links
 
 
 

2003 births
Living people
Sportspeople from Târgu Jiu
Romanian footballers
Romania youth international footballers
Association football midfielders
Liga I players
FC Viitorul Constanța players
FCV Farul Constanța players